This is a list of extreme points in Antarctica.

List
 The tallest mountain in Antarctica is Vinson Massif rising 4,892 meters (16,050 feet) above sea level.
 The lowest point in Antarctica is within the Denman Glacier, which reaches 3.5 kilometers (11,500 feet) below sea level. This is also the lowest place on Earth not covered by ocean (although it is covered by ice).
 The lowest accessible point in Antarctica is the shore of Deep Lake, Vestfold Hills, which is 50.4 m beneath sea level.
This is also known as the South Pole of inaccessibility.
 Antarctica is the southernmost land mass on Earth. It is here that the southernmost human habitation on Earth is located: Amundsen–Scott South Pole Station (U.S. Administered Base).
 Vostok Station is the most isolated research base on the continent (located at ), and it is situated over the southernmost lake in the world, Lake Vostok, a subglacial lake 4,000 metres (13,000 feet) under the surface of the ice where the station sits. Formerly administrated by the Soviets, it is now operated by Russia.
 The southernmost volcano on the planet—Mount Erebus—is in Antarctica on the world's southernmost island reachable from the sea: Ross Island.
 The southernmost island is said to be Berkner Island. It is embedded in the ice shelf, fully covered by ice and fully below sea level, and therefore not an island, but an ice rise. The southernmost true island is probably Black Island (Ross Archipelago).
However, this area is covered by the Ross Ice Shelf. The southernmost open sea is also part of Ross Sea, namely Bay of Whales at 78°30'S, at the edge of Ross Ice Shelf.
The Antarctic Peninsula is the largest contiguous part of the continent projecting north of the Antarctic Circle and thus has many of the continent's research bases. The northernmost research base on the mainland is Esperanza Base.
 The southernmost point is the South Pole at

Other extremes
 While animal life such as penguins and seals are found all around the Antarctic coastline, the continent's only flowering plants are found on the northern portion of the Antarctic Peninsula (see Antarctic flora).
 Highest temperature so far recorded in Antarctica:  at Vanda Station (New Zealand administered station) on 5 January 1974.
 Lowest temperature so far recorded in Antarctica:  in the interior of the Antarctica in August 2010. The record temperature was found by scientists sifting through decades of climate data taken by Earth-orbiting satellites.
Winds regularly exceed 200 km/h here.
 Antarctica has the world's lowest rainfall average (zero at the Geographic South Pole) and thus is the world's driest continent.
 Despite its low rainfall average, Antarctica has approximately 70% of the world's fresh water (as well as 90% of the world's ice).

See also

 Extreme points of the Arctic
 Farthest South

References

Geography of Antarctica
Antarctica
Antarctica